Vučja Gorica (or Gorica) is a castle in northern Croatia, located near Mali Tabor and Hum na Sutli in Krapina-Zagorje County.

References

External links
 Video
 Vučja Gorica - located near Mali Tabor
 Old photo

Castles in Croatia
Buildings and structures in Krapina-Zagorje County
Vučja Gorica